Roy "Rocky" D. Fund (August 5, 1950 - April 28, 2011) was a Republican member of the Kansas House of Representatives, representing the 50th district.  He served from 2007 until his death in 2011. The Americans for Prosperity - Kansas Chapter gave him an 85% rating on conservative issues.

Fund worked as a District Manager for the Water District.

Committee membership
 Energy and Utilities
 Federal and State Affairs
 Agriculture and Natural Resources (Vice-Chair)
 Joint Committee on Special Claims Against the State

Major Donors
The top 5 donors to Fund's 2008 campaign:
1. Prairie Band Potawatomi Nation 	$1,000 	
2. Kansas Contractors Assoc 	$1,000 	
3. Kansas Optometric Assoc 	$750 	
4. AT&T 	$750 	
5. Kansas Medical Society 	$500

Obituary 

"Representative Rocky Fund was born August 5, 1950 in Sabetha, Kansas, the 5th of 7 children. His parents, Marty and Aleck Fund lived on a farm near Goff, Kansas. He attended school in Goff and graduated from Wetmore High School. After graduation, he joined the air force, married Linda McKee, was stationed at McConnell Air Force Base in Wichita, KS and served in Southeast Asia during the Vietnam War. He returned home to Kansas, worked at Learjet and earned his bachelor's degree at Wichita State University. He also earned a Farrier's license from Oklahoma Farrier's College. Rocky was a horseshoer (farrier), in Wichita and northeast Kansas, a teacher and coach at Royal Valley and Jackson Heights for 21 years, served on the Rural Water District #3 Jackson County Water Board for 16 years before becoming its District Manager for 10 years. He was elected State Representative from the 50th district in 2006 and was serving his third term. Rocky was an Optimist, a member of the American Legion and Veterans of Foreign Wars."

Published in Topeka Capital-Journal on April 30, 2011

References

External links
 Kansas Legislature - Rocky Fund
 Project Vote Smart profile
 Kansas Votes profile
 Follow the Money campaign contributions:
 2006, 2008

Republican Party members of the Kansas House of Representatives
2011 deaths
1950 births
21st-century American politicians
Wichita State University alumni
United States Air Force personnel of the Vietnam War